Sensibility Objectified: The Sculptures of Sarbari Roy Choudhury is a book by R. Siva Kumar that discusses the life and sculptures of Sarbari Roy Choudhury.
According to R. Siva kumar the 'sculptural sensibility' of Sarbari Roy Choudhury, represented in his figurative and animated works, reveals the artist's connection with the Indian traditions of sculpture, despite being strongly influenced by the West.

Some of Roy's best works are of classical musicians—Bade Ghulam Ali Khan, Ali Akbar Khan, Siddheshwari Devi and Kesarbai Kerkar. Starting from the 1950s, the monograph traces his work of each decade, revealing the artistic journey of one of India's leading sculptors.

References

Art history books
Books by R. Siva Kumar
Case studies
Works about art genres
Works about ideologies
2010 non-fiction books